Andrés Ricaurte Vélez (born 3 October 1991) is a Colombian footballer who plays for Independiente Medellín, as an attacking midfielder.

Club career
Born in Medellín, Ricaurte graduated from the Rionegro Águilas youth academy. He made his first team debut on 4 May 2011, coming on as a second-half substitute in a 1–2 Copa Colombia away loss against Independiente Medellín.

Ricaurte made his Categoría Primera A debut on 14 April 2012, playing the last four minutes in a 1–1 home draw against the same opponent. His first goal in the category occurred on 10 November, as he scored the opener in a 3–2 away defeat of Atlético Huila.

After being rarely used, Ricaurte moved to Categoría Primera B side Leones ahead of the 2016 season. He scored a career-best ten goals for the side, which included a hat-trick in a 4–1 away routing of Bogotá FC on 20 March.

In 2017, Ricaurte joined Atlético Huila back in the top tier. On 15 December of that year, after being an ever-present figure for the side, he agreed to a contract with Independiente Medellín.

He scored his first goal of the 2018 season on 11 February, a game winner against Boyaca Chico. On 15 October he scored another game winner against América de Cali, and three days later he scored in a 2–0 victory against Atlético Bucaramanga. Medellin eventually made the final of the Finalizacion tournament, but lost 5–4 to Junior. The following year, Ricaurte was part of the Medellin squad that won the 2019 Copa Colombia, and scored a goal in the first leg of the semifinals against Deportivo Pasto.

On 14 August 2020, MLS side FC Dallas officially confirmed Ricaurte's transfer, announcing the move as an initial loan with an option to make the deal permanent in December 2021. On 12 September, he scored his first goal for the club in a 2–1 victory against Houston Dynamo.

Personal life
Ricaurte's father Carlos was also a footballer and a midfielder who notably represented Atlético Nacional. His cousin Juan Guillermo, was also a professional player.

Career statistics

References

External links
 
 

1991 births
Living people
Colombian footballers
Colombian expatriate footballers
Expatriate soccer players in the United States
Association football midfielders
Categoría Primera A players
Categoría Primera B players
Águilas Doradas Rionegro players
Leones F.C. footballers
Atlético Huila footballers
Independiente Medellín footballers
FC Dallas players
Footballers from Medellín
Major League Soccer players